The Man with the Carnation (translit. O anthropos me to garyfallo) is a 1980 Greek drama film directed by Nikos Tzimas, dealing with the arrest, trial and execution of the Greek Communist Nikos Belogiannis and his associates in 1951–1952. It was entered into the 12th Moscow International Film Festival where it won a Special Diploma. The film was also selected as the Greek entry for the Best Foreign Language Film at the 54th Academy Awards, but was not accepted as a nominee.

Cast
 Alekos Alexandrakis as Minister Georgios Kartalis
 Angelos Antonopoulos as Tom
 Kostas Kazakos
 Vangelis Kazan as Major Georgios Papadopoulos, member of the court martial and future dictator
 Petros Fyssoun
 Manos Katrakis as Prime Minister Nikolaos Plastiras
 Foivos Gikopoulos as Nikos Belogiannis
 Costas Arzoglou
 Anestis Vlahos as Apostolos

See also
 List of submissions to the 54th Academy Awards for Best Foreign Language Film
 List of Greek submissions for the Academy Award for Best Foreign Language Film

References

External links
 

1980 films
1980 drama films
Greek biographical drama films
1980s biographical drama films
1980s Greek-language films
1980s political drama films
Films about communism
Films scored by Mikis Theodorakis